Dhruv is a spelling variant of Dhruva. It is a Sanskrit word and commonly refers to:

 Dhruva, a devotee of Vishnu who later became the Pole Star in Hindu mythology
Dhruv may also refer to:

Military 
 HAL Dhruv, a multi-role helicopter developed and manufactured by India's Hindustan Aeronautics Limited
 INS Dhruv, a missile range instrumentation ship of the Indian Navy

People 
Dhruv Rathee, Indian YouTuber
Dhruv Sehgal, Indian actor
Dhruv Pandove, Indian cricketer
 Dhruv Vikram, Indian actor
Anandshankar Dhruv (1869–1942), Indian writer

See also 
 Dhruva (disambiguation)